Mekonnen or Mekonen is a male name of Ethiopian origin. Notable people with the name include:

Mekonnen
Abebe Mekonnen (born 1964), Ethiopian long-distance runner
Demeke Mekonnen (born 1963), Ethiopian politician and Deputy Prime Minister of Ethiopia
Deresse Mekonnen (born 1987), Ethiopian middle-distance runner
Eyob Mekonnen (1975–2013), Ethiopian reggae singer
Hailu Mekonnen (born 1980), Ethiopian long-distance runner 
Se'are Mekonnen (died 2019), Chief of General Staff of the Ethiopian National Defence Forces 
Seifu Mekonnen (1953–2020), Ethiopian Olympic boxer
Tadesse Mekonnen (born 1958), Ethiopian cyclist
Ayele Mekonnen (born 1957), Ethiopian cyclist
Tsegaye Mekonnen (born 1995), Ethiopian long-distance runner
Wallelign Mekonnen (1945–1972), Ethiopian Marxist activist and writer
Mekonnen Gebremedhin (born 1988), Ethiopian middle-distance runner

Mekonen

See also
Makonnen

Amharic-language names